Ronny Claes (born 10 October 1957) is a former Belgian racing cyclist. He rode three editions of the Tour de France between 1980 and 1983. He finished in third place in the 1980 Liège–Bastogne–Liège.

References

External links

1957 births
Living people
Belgian male cyclists
People from Stolberg (Rhineland)
Sportspeople from Cologne (region)